Clifton Johnson may refer to:
 Clifton Johnson (jurist) (1941–2009)
 Clifton Johnson (author) (1865–1940)
 Clifton H. Johnson (1921–2008), historian